Susan or Sue Tanner may refer to:
Susan W. Tanner (born 1953), of the Latter Day Saints
Susan Jane Tanner, English actress